Nyssen is a surname. Notable people with the surname include:

Françoise Nyssen (born 1951), French-Belgian publisher and politician
Gregory Nyssen also known Gregory of Nyssa (c. 335–c. 395), was bishop of Nyssa from 372 to 376 and from 378 until his death
Guillaume Nyssen (1886 –date of death unknown), Belgian racing cyclist
Hubert Nyssen (1925–2011), Belgian-French writer, publisher and founder of the Éditions Actes Sud
Jan Nyssen (born 1957), Belgian physical geographer

See also 
Strunk–Nyssen House, is a home/hotel/brewery built by two brewers in Jackson Township, Minnesota, United States
Ernest Nyssens (1868–1956), Belgian homeopath, naturopath, theosophist and vegetarianism activist